Metasia gigantalis is a species of moth in the family Crambidae. It is found in Greece, the Republic of Macedonia and on Cyprus, Crete and Sicily.

Taxonomy
The species was formerly treated as a synonym of Metasia carnealis, but was reinstated as a valid species in 2013.

References

Moths described in 1871
Metasia
Moths of Europe